Khujan (also Romanized as Khūjān; also known as Kharjān and Khūrjān) is a village in Darbqazi Rural District, in the Central District of Nishapur County, Razavi Khorasan Province, Iran. At the 2006 census, its population was 593, in 146 families.

References 

Populated places in Nishapur County